Dytiscus latissimus is a species of beetle in family Dytiscidae.

Description
This beetle is similar in structure to the better-known and widespread D. marginalis, but it is clearly larger and especially wider. The species is usually easy to recognize by the extensions on both sides of the shield. The elytra and the pronotum are dark brown with yellow sides. The head is black, while the legs are yellow. The male's wing cases are shiny, while those of the female are finely grooved. This voracious predator hunts a wide variety of prey, including other insects, tadpoles, and small fish. Before they dive, they collect air bubbles in their wing cases which go through the spiracles.

Distribution
This species can be found in northern and central European countries. The species is listed on Annex II and Annex IV of the European Union Habitats Directive; the latter gives it strict protection within the EU member countries.

Habitat
It is an aquatic species and it inhabits in dense vegetation, mainly of Carex and Equisetum, at the edges of lakes or in nonflowing waters and deep ponds. They key parameter of the habitat is the abundance of case-making caddis flies, which serve as the primary food for D. latissimus larvae.

Conservation
The species was extirpated from much of its previous area, including most of Central Europe. The main reason is the rise of intensive use of water bodies for fish production.
There is a successful breeding program for this species in Latvia, which gives hope for potential reintroduction into formerly inhabited areas, should they become habitable for the species in the future.

Gallery

References

Further reading
 Biolib
 Fauna europaea
 Anders N. Nilsson, Mogens Holmen - The aquatic Adephaga (Coleoptera)  of Fennoscandia and Denmark, vol. 2

External links
 Dytiscus latissimus  - Distribution Map
  Wild Denmark

Dytiscidae
Beetles of Europe
Beetles described in 1758
Taxonomy articles created by Polbot
Taxa named by Carl Linnaeus